Mohammad Abdul Khaleq was a Bangladeshi politician and freedom fighter from Netrokona. He was a former Member of Parliament for the Mymensingh-25 constituency as a part of the Awami League.

Early life
Abdul Khaleq was born into a Bengali Muslim family in Mogalhata, Duoj Union, Netrokona District.

Career
Khaleq was elected to parliament from Mymensingh-25 as an Awami League candidate in 1973.

Death
Khaleq was shot outside his home in Moktarpara, Netrokona on 24 February 1974 and was subsequently taken to Combined Military Hospital (Dhaka) where he died.

References

Awami League politicians
1974 deaths
1st Jatiya Sangsad members
Assassinated Bangladeshi politicians
People from Atpara Upazila
1974 murders in Bangladesh